Backstage, also previously written as Back Stage, is an American entertainment industry trade publication. Founded by Allen Zwerdling and Ira Eaker in 1960, it covers the film and performing arts industry from the perspective of performers, unions, and casting, with an emphasis on topics such as job opportunities and career advice. The brand encompasses the main Backstage magazine, and related publications such as its website, Call Sheet (formerly Ross Reports)—a bi-monthly directory of talent agents, casting directors, and casting calls, and other casting resources. 

The publication was founded in, and originally focused primarily on New York City and the U.S. east coast. In the 1990s, Back Stage established the Los Angeles-based Back Stage West, which competed primarily with the longer-established Drama-Logue; in 1998, Drama-Logue was acquired by Back Stage and merged into Back Stage West. In 2008, both versions were merged into a single national edition.

From the 1990s through the early 2010s, Backstage was a sister to fellow entertainment publications Billboard and The Hollywood Reporter, and later Adweek, via Billboard Publications and its corporate successors, such as Nielsen Business Media and Prometheus Global Media. In 2011, Back Stage was divested by Prometheus to a group led by John Amato, who relaunched the print and digital publications. After being briefly being re-acquired by Prometheus, it was sold to RZ Capital in 2013.

History 

Backstage (the company) was founded by Allen Zwerdling and Ira Eaker in New York City in December 1960 as a weekly tabloid-sized newspaper called Back Stage. Zwerdling and Eaker had worked together for years as editor and advertising director, respectively, of the Show Business casting newspaper, which was founded by Leo Shull as Actor's Cues in 1941. After Zwerdling and Eaker left Show Business they looked into creating a casting section within The Village Voice newspaper; but, having been turned down, they decided to launch Backstage on their own.

At the time of its founding, Backstage (the newsmagazine) was primarily a casting paper for New York actors intended to compete with Show Business Weekly. It gradually broadened its scope to include coverage of New York's television commercial production industry and a variety of performing arts, the former of which proved to be so lucrative advertising-wise that the commercial-production beat came to dominate the publication. Additionally, Backstage's reach began to slowly spread across the U.S., although the largest portion of its readership remained on the East Coast.

Owing to the disparity between its main areas of coverage—a focus on casting and entertainment-industry job opportunities, general coverage of the performing arts (acting, legitimate theatre, cabaret, etc.), and its expanding coverage of the commercial production market—Backstage eventually incorporated the film and video production elements of its coverage into a weekly pull-out section called Backstage Shoot, a sort of mini-publication with a special focus on the commercials industry.

Then, in 1975, Backstage opened a Los Angeles bureau and began to more actively extend its casting and editorial coverage across the U.S., with correspondents based in Boston, Florida, Chicago, London, and other key entertainment-industry-centric areas added to the Backstage roster over the years.

Around 1977, co-founder Ira Eaker's daughter, Sherry Eaker, joined Backstage as an editor and worked to further expand Backstages editorial coverage, especially in the areas of theater criticism, cabaret, dance, union news, and advice columns for performers. Sherry Eaker also fostered a relationship between Backstage and its historical antecedent, the British-based newspaper The Stage, which shared a similar look, printing schedule, and market-focus.

In 1986, Backstage was bought by Billboard Publications Inc. (BPI), owner of such publications as Billboard (magazine). In 1988, BPI bought The Hollywood Reporter. Backstage and The Hollywood Reporter along with a few other related brands, were grouped together within BPI, becoming its film and performing arts division, a group designed to compete with Variety and other entertainment-industry trade publications. Backstage would become involved in a number of other acquisitions, mergers, spin-offs, and sales over the next few decades.

Backstage Shoot

On July 6, 1990, the Backstage Shoot pull-out section of Backstage magazine was spun off into a full, standalone publication, SHOOT. The concept was to have Backstage concentrate on actors, performing artists, and theatre, while SHOOT would continue to "serve the news and information needs of creative and production decision-makers at ad agencies, and executives & artisans in the production industry" (according to their official press materials found on ShootOnline.com). To emphasize the change, the official Backstage tagline "The complete service weekly for the communications and entertainment industry" was switched to The Performing Arts Weekly.

Ross Reports
Around this time, Backstage acquired the New York-based Ross Reports publication, a monthly digest founded in 1949 by Wallace A. Ross.  The Ross Reports compiled information on casting directors, agents, managers, production companies, and upcoming film and television productions.

In early 1994, Netherlands-based company VNU bought Backstage owner BPI. VNU eventually came to own a variety of trade publications — including all of the BPI magazines as well as Mediaweek, Adweek, Film Journal International, The Hollywood Creative Directory, and many others — along with measurement company Nielsen Media Research, and events such as ShoWest and the Clio Awards.

Back Stage West
Also in early 1994, Back Stage publisher Steve Elish hired a West Coast editor-in-chief, Rob Kendt, to help create a new publication, Back Stage West, a weekly trade paper similar to the New York-based Back Stage but with a focus on the West Coast acting community and casting opportunities based in California. At the time, despite past efforts, Backstage was still popular primarily in the Northeast U.S.

In May 1998, Back Stage acquired its main local competitor, Drama-Logue; The Drama-Logue company was founded by Bill Bordy in 1969 as a casting hotline, and in 1972 it became a weekly trade publication entitled The Hollywood Drama-Logue Casting Sheet, commonly known simply as Drama-Logue. Before the end of 1998, Drama-Logue's holdings were fully integrated into Backstage.com and Back Stage West, which for a time was co-branded as Back Stage West/Drama-Logue.

Backstage.com
Beginning in the late 1990s, a number of casting information and entertainment job websites began cropping up, offering specialized online tools for actors, performers, and models, including online casting submission systems and video-enhanced resumes. Backstage.com, introduced by Publisher Steve Elish, was a leader in taking the casting industry online. Its early products included a paid member's area, which charged $9.95 per month for unlimited access to articles and casting calls across New York, Los Angeles, Chicago, Florida, Las Vegas, and other key entertainment-industry hubs. The monthly fee also entitled subscribers to inclusion in the website's first iteration of a headshot and resume database.

Starting in 2000, writer-editor-filmmaker and web-developer Luke Crowe joined the company, and began working on the development of online casting tools for Backstage. Over the next few years, Backstage.com introduced options for casting directors to self-post breakdowns, a searchable acting-jobs database of casting notices, interactive audition lists, casting coverage in every state in the U.S., and an advanced headshot and resume talent database, among other new options, some of the first online tools ever developed for actors and casting directors. The number of new casting notices listed on Backstage.com each week expanded from the hundreds to the thousands over the next few years, while monthly site traffic increased from the hundreds-of-thousands to the millions.

In addition to encompassing all of the content from Backstages print publications, the website's scope continued to expand to include more online-exclusive casting notices and original online-only news stories, feature articles, entertainment-industry listings, and reviews. During this time period, several competitors challenged the brand, but it remained the industry leader. However, the competition eventually sparked major changes in Backstages development, and in October 2005 Backstage relaunched its print and online publications in order to regain its edge.

Relaunches and acquisitions
During this 2005 relaunch process, all Backstage publications were redesigned (including Backstage West); various staffing changes took place; the East Coast/New York edition of Backstage was renamed Backstage East; Backstage.com began publishing more articles on a daily basis and introduced more exclusive editorial content, blogs, feeds, and tools; and Casting. Backstage.com was founded, giving Backstage.com users access to even more advanced casting/job search, sort, alert, and application tools, along with a more robust talent database featuring resumes, pictures, video reels, and audio reels of thousands of working and aspiring actors and performers.

Around this same time, the primary Backstage tagline changed from "The Performing Arts Weekly" to "The Actor's Resource." A secondary branding slogan, "Casting You Can Trust — Since 1960" was also added and given prominent placement both on Backstage.com and on the front covers of the weekly East Coast and West Coast newspaper/magazine versions of Backstage. And sister publication SHOOT (and ShootOnline.com) was sold to another publishing company.

In 2006, a company called Valcon Acquisition B.V., run by a private equity group consortium, bought VNU, making Valcon the new owner of Backstage and all other VNU holdings. Then, on January 18, 2007, VNU rebranded itself The Nielsen Company, with its trade-publication division being renamed Nielsen Business Media.

In early 2007, VP/Group Publisher Steve Elish retired from Backstage after 34 years. However, co-founder Ira Eaker's daughter, former longtime Backstage editor-in-chief Sherry Eaker, carried on her father's work as Backstage's editor at large, along with editor-at-large David Sheward, who left his executive editor position at Backstage after working for the brand for over 28 years. Former publishers include Steve Elish, Jeff Black, and Charlie Weiss. Former lead editors include Sherry Eaker, Rob Kendt, Jamie Painter Young, Daniel Holloway, Dany Margolies, Tom Penketh, Erik Haagensen, Roger Armbrust, Leonard Jacobs, David Fairhurst, Andrew Salomon, Dan Lehman, dance editor Jennie Schulman (who wrote for Backstage for over 40 continuous years, starting with its first issue on Dec. 2, 1960), film and television editor Jenelle Riley, contributing editor Jackie Apodaca, and actor-columnist Michael Kostroff (known for his work in The Wire), among others.

In October 2008, Backstage East and Backstage West were permanently combined into a single weekly publication with an expanded national focus. This new "national edition" was given the same name as the original 1960 edition: Back Stage.

Backstage also launched a number of blogs around this time, including Blog Stage, Espresso, Backstage Unscripted, and The Backstage 411 Casting FAQ, all of which were discontinued in early 2012.

In early 2009, Ross Reports was renamed Call Sheet by Backstage, working with The Hollywood Creative Directory to expand its listings to include a wider variety of entertainment-industry contacts.

In late 2009, Backstage and other Nielsen Business Media brands were sold to e5 Global Media, which was later renamed Prometheus Global Media, and then renamed Guggenheim Digital Media.

The Backstage brand remained closely tied to its primary sister publications, The Hollywood Reporter and Billboard, as well as the other e5 Global Media publications, such as Adweek, Film Journal International, and The Hollywood Creative Directory. However, Backstage also carved out its own industry niche by focusing on the needs of actors, models, performers, and casting directors; publishing directories (such as Call Sheet, a bimonthly listing of talent agents, casting directors, and film productions), books (actor handbooks and biographies published under the Watson-Guptill imprint Backstage Books), casting-director mailing labels, and special "insert" magazines (such as award-season nomination guides, theatre-school guides, and the ACTION magazine for actors interested in making their own movies); producing live events; and continuing the development of Internet casting technology.

Backstage continued to be a resource for audition information, casting calls/casting notices, training opportunities, and entertainment-industry jobs, news, and interviews. Film and theatre were the main topics reviewed and reported upon, but the television, radio, dance, music, cabaret, voice-over, modeling, commercial advertising, and stand-up comedy industries were also included in Backstages coverage.

In October 2011, media entrepreneur John Amato led Backstage through a spin-off from Prometheus Global Media as part of a new strategic partnership, with the new company being called Backstage, LLC. Prometheus shareholder Guggenheim Partners backed the sale.

In August 2012, Back Stage was relaunched again, with the magazine switching from a tabloid-sized newspaper to a smaller, full-color glossy magazine (and also being slightly rebranded from Back Stage to Backstage). The magazine added increased cross-promotion for the resources and utilities on the similarly-redesigned Backstage.com. Amato stated readers had requested that the print edition have a smaller form factor to make it easier to take to casting calls, while the redesigned website was meant to "[lead] the user into the products and content that we’ve seen historically be the most helpful for our audience". 

In January 2013, Backstage LLC acquired Sonicbids, a service designed to help musicians find gigs, for $15 million. In April 2013, Prometheus Global Media, now fully owned by Guggenheim, bought the remainder of Backstage LLC. John Amato was made president of the Billboard Group, a new unit that would oversee Backstage, Billboard, and Sonicbids. In December 2013, Backstage and Sonicbids were acquired by RZ Capital.

In December 2016, Backstage expanded its online casting tools and editorial coverage to include a wider international scope, with an initial focus on casting in the United Kingdom.

In October 2017, Backstage launched its first fully integrated mobile casting app.

Current team
As of 2017, principals at Backstage included vice president and national casting editor Luke Crowe. Current Backstage writers and editors include managing casting editor Melinda Loewenstein and supervising casting editor Veronika Daddona, among many others.

Casting 
Backstage’s casting department reviews and publishes more than 30,000 casting notices on Backstage.com every year, for projects that range from major studio and network productions and Broadway shows to indie and student films. By monitoring the notices, Backstage is able to quickly work to protect actors from scams, while facilitating the distribution of hundreds of thousands of performance opportunities via a suite of online casting tools.

Editorial 
Backstage Magazine features a different actor on its cover every week with original photography, along with entertainment-industry news and advice columns. Previous cover subjects have included Academy Award winners Kevin Spacey, Benicio Del Toro, Jennifer Lawrence, Lupita Nyong’o, and Eddie Redmayne. Backstage.com also features a series of advice columns written by industry insiders called Backstage Experts, offering aspiring and working actors the know-how to find work and improve their craft. There are also features on different acting schools, coaches, and theater companies around the country.

Events 

From 1992-2012, Backstage produced annual Actorfest trade shows, entertainment-industry networking events held in various cities. Past Actorfest events took place in New York City, Los Angeles, Philadelphia, and Detroit. Other Backstage events in the past included the annual Backstage Garland Awards (previously known as the Drama-Logue Award) honoring the California theatre scene; the annual Bistro Awards honoring the cabaret industry, especially NYC-based cabaret; and the bi-coastal An Evening With ... series that combined film screenings with Q&A sessions featuring key actors and directors from each film being shown.

Additionally, Backstage hosted classes, workshops, and networking events through its Backstage University brand, and sponsors numerous events and panels for talent working in the fields of film, television, commercials, radio/voice-overs, theatre, dance, modeling, and club talent (comedians, singers, etc.). Its "Successful Actor" panel series was done in partnership with the American Academy of Dramatic Arts.

References

External links

Related sources

 About Backstage: History, Masthead, and More Info
 Backstages Team Bios
 Backstages official partner page on Indiegogo
 All About SHOOT Magazine
 Drama-Logue Sells Assets to Backstage West
 Assessing the Demise of Drama-Logue
 Billboard Buys The Hollywood Reporter
 Backstage Splits into Backstage / Shoot
 Nielsen Business Media
 Backstage Co-Founder Ira Eaker Dies
 Backstage Co-Founder Allen Zwerdling Dies
 Backstage Gets a Makeover 
 Publisher Steve Elish Retires
 Jeff Black Named Vice President/General Manager
 Leo Shull's Show Business
 Show Business Weekly
 Backstage launches new Digital Editions
 Backstage.com wins the Folio Magazine 2009 Eddie Award for best "Business to Business, Media/Entertainment/Publishing, Website"
 Nielsen Sells Backstage, The Hollywood Reporter, Billboard
 The Hollywood Reporters Parent Company, Prometheus, selling Backstage
 Prometheus Global Media, Investor Group Strike Alliance for Backstage
 Backstage Celebrates 50th Anniversary
 Testimonials From Famed Artists; famous actors recall their start with Backstage
 Now in its 20th Year, Actorfest to Gain Expanded Reach
 Backstage Reaches Definitive Agreement to Acquire Audition Update
 Guggenheim Partners Launches Guggenheim Digital Media
 Backstage Acquires Music Promotion Startup Sonicbids
 Guggenheim Digital Media Announces Formation of Billboard Group 
 Backstage Film & TV Editor Jenelle Riley Joins Variety as Associate Editor, Features
 Indiegogo Announces Partnership with Backstage
 Backstage Executive Editor Daniel Holloway Joins Broadcasting & Cable Magazine as Programming and Digital Media Editor

1960 establishments in New York City
Entertainment trade magazines
Magazines established in 1960
1998 mergers and acquisitions
2013 mergers and acquisitions
Magazines published in New York City
Weekly magazines published in the United States